Ross Hawkins (born 28 December 1973) is a South African rower. He competed in the men's lightweight coxless four event at the 2000 Summer Olympics.

References

External links
 

1973 births
Living people
South African male rowers
Olympic rowers of South Africa
Rowers at the 2000 Summer Olympics
Sportspeople from Germiston
21st-century South African people